Grain Valley High School is a high school in the Grain Valley R-V School District in Grain Valley, Missouri, United States.

The school offers several Advanced Placement (AP) and Project Lead the Way (PLTW) courses.  It participates in the A+ program giving students the chance to attend a two-year community college or vocational school if they meet certain requirements.
The first brick school, built in 1909, was destroyed by fire in 1925.  It was replaced and housed all students until January, 1954, when an elementary (K-6) building was erected adjacent to the junior high and high school. In the early 1990s a middle school was added on the south edge of town.  Eventually, this became the site of the Grain Valley High School and the road in front, originally MO Route AA, now named Eagles Parkway.

Extracurricular programs 

Grain Valley High School has many extracurricular activities such as an academic bowl team, speech and debate team, CAPPIES team, robotics club, culinary club, drama club, yearbook club, an otaku games club, a GSA, and a student government. In addition, the school also has DECA, FBLA, FCCLA, NHS, and HOSA chapters. They also have a self-led publication named "Eagle Media Productions".

The Grain Valley Marching Eagles Band was selected to march in the 2016 Macy's Thanksgiving Day Parade.

Banning of LGBT support 
In 2022 Grain Valley High School board voted to ban any stickers, cards or other objects showing support for LGBT students.

Sports 

The school has teams in baseball, softball, volleyball, football, wrestling, cross country, cheerleading, and dance. In addition, they have both boys and girls teams in soccer, tennis, basketball, swim and dive, and golf.
Their mascot is the Eagle, most recently portrayed by Joseph Pitman.

References

External links

High schools in Jackson County, Missouri
Public high schools in Missouri